Association of Mature American Citizens (AMAC) is a United States-based conservative advocacy organization and interest group, founded in 2007. Its president and founder was Daniel C. Weber, a retired insurance agency owner.

AMAC is a membership organization for people age 50 and over. The group calls itself "the conservative alternative to the AARP." It is one of several organizations to position itself as conservative rivals to the AARP; others include the American Seniors Association and 60 Plus Association.

Political activities 
AMAC describes itself as "vigorously conservative" and gained support from talk show host Glenn Beck and other conservative figures. AMAC strongly opposes the Affordable Care Act (ACA) and has pushed for its repeal. In March 2014, AMAC claimed a membership of 1.1 million members, up from 40,000 in 2008, which it attributed to backlash over the ACA.

AMAC supports a plan for Social Security which would gradually increase the earliest retirement age to 64 (from 62) and "guarantee cost-of-living increases in a tiered structure based on income." AMAC supports the oil and gas industry, claiming that they "are safer for the environment than ever before." The group's president, Dan Weber, called for a rollback of Obama administration policies to promote clean energy.

The AMAC has a volunteer "delegate" program, aiming to select an AMAC member in each congressional district across the country to meet and lobby members of Congress.

In February 2017 AMAC issued a warning to the upcoming 2017 Academy Awards ceremony to not tolerate speeches against President Donald Trump, threatening to launch a boycott of theaters.

Political analyst Josh Bernstein is currently a National Spokesperson for AMAC, which sponsors his weekly political talk show.

References

External links 
 

2007 establishments in the United States
501(c)(4) nonprofit organizations
Lobbying organizations in the United States
Organizations established in 2007
Political advocacy groups in the United States
Retirement in the United States
Seniors' organizations